Basilic can refer to: 

 Basilic (cannon)
 Basilic vein
 French for basilisk

See also
 Basil (name), of which Basilic is a variant